Ivy Kombo-Kasi is a Zimbabwean gospel music artist and lawyer based in the United Kingdom. She is also co-founder of Nguva Yakwana Gospel Show.

Early life
Kombo was born in 1975 in Harare, Zimbabwe, and grew up in Glen View 4 suburb. She did her secondary education at St Johns Chikwaka. She relocated to the United Kingdom in 2006. She studied LLB Law and LLM International Commercial Law at the University of Bedfordshire the MSC Project Management at University of Northampton.

Career
Ivy Kombo started singing when she was 10 years old in primary school and she composed her first song "Be Thou My Vision" at St Johns Chikwaka High School. The track was later included on the album Mufudzi Wangu which was released in 1994 as the debut album of the popular gospel music group; Ezekiel Guti Evangelical Association (EGEA) Gospel Train. The group was made of three members; Ivy Kombo, her twin sister Anne Kombo and Carol Mujokoro Chivengwa.

Her professional career actually started when she joined the Ezekiel Guti Evangelical Association Gospel Train (EGEA) popularly known as Gospel Train which was founded by Admire Kasi. Later, Ivy Kombo recorded her debut album in 1993 titled Mufudzi Wangu with the group. EGEA Gospel Train recorded four successful albums between 1993 and 1996. Around 1996 , Carol Mujokoro Chivengwa and Ivy Kombo left the group to pursue solo career.

In her career from 1993, Ivy Kombo recorded songs annually. As a solo artist  Kombo released several radio hits including Nguva Yakwana, Handidzokre Shure, Mwari Ndimweya and Wawana Jesu.

In 2000, Kombo became the director of Gospel Train Records and co-founder of Nguva Yakwana Celebrations gospel shows in 2002 which featured South African renowned artistes Vuyo Mokoena the late, Sipho Makhabane, Thembinkosi, Lundi Tyamara and Buhle as well as Fungisai. In 2001, Ivy Kombo was part of Zimbabwe Broadcasting Corporation vision 2020 music initiative along with Chiwoniso Maraire and Busi Ncube. In 2002, Kombo was a founding member of Ruvhuvhuto Sisters during her solo career which consisted of Plaxedes Wenyika, Fortunate Matenga and the late Jackie Madondo. The group's first project was the Miss Malaika beauty pageant promotional jingle held in 2003.

Discography
Albums

As part of EGEA Gospel Train: 
Mufudzi Wangu 1993/4
Ndinokudai Jesu 1994
Vimba naJehovah 1995
Kutenda 1996

As a Solo Artist:
Ndaidziwanepi Nyasha 1997
Hosanna Wekudenga 1998
Denga Rinotaura 2000
Nyengetera 2000
Mufudzi Wangu Special (2nd Edition) 2001- featuring Jackie Madondo
Nguva Yakwana 2002
Handidzokere Shure Part 1 2003
Handidzokere Shure Part 2 2003
Two Minutes 2008
Like Mt Zion 2019
The Tribute 2021

Singles

Ndiyaniko 2019
Takazvipihwa 2022

Awards
Best Gospel Artists - Tinotenda Siyabonga Annual Music Awards 2000
Best Selling Gospel Artist - National Arts Merit Awards 2003
Best Female Gospel Artist - National Arts Merit Awards 2003

Personal life
Ivy Kombo is married to Admire Kasi who is the founder of UpperView International Ministries.

References

Further reading
Zimbabwean gospel music reinventing itself, The Herald Sunday Mail
The Dominance of Women in Gospel Music
A study of Gospel Music in Zimbabwe, by Ezra Chatando
1990-2000: Emergence of ‘sungura’ gospel music, The Herald (Zimbabwe)
Struggles over Culture: Zimbabwean Music and Power, 1930s-2007, by Moses Chikowero at Dalhousie University

1975 births
Zimbabwean emigrants to the United Kingdom
Living people
Zimbabwean composers
Zimbabwean songwriters
20th-century Zimbabwean women singers
21st-century Zimbabwean women singers